The Emergency Response Guidebook: A Guidebook for First Responders During the Initial Phase of a Dangerous Goods/Hazardous Materials Transportation Incident (ERG) is used by emergency response personnel (such as firefighters, paramedics and police officers) in Canada, Mexico, and the United States when responding to a transportation emergency involving hazardous materials. First responders in Argentina, Brazil, and Colombia have recently begun using the ERG as well. It is produced by the United States Department of Transportation, Transport Canada, and the Secretariat of Communications and Transportation (Mexico).  The principal authors of the ERG are Transport Canada's Michel Cloutier and U.S. DOT's George Cushmac.

Guidebook Contents 
The ERG is primarily applicable for hazardous materials transported by highway and railway, but also is applicable for materials transported by air or waterway, as well as by pipeline. It was first issued by the US Department of Transportation in 1973, but later became a joint publication of the Department of Transportation (US DOT), Transport Canada (TC), and the Secretariat of Communications and Transportation (SCT) of Mexico, with collaboration with the Chemistry Information Center for Emergencies (CIQUIME) of Argentina. The ERG is issued every 4 years, with editions now being published in Spanish (Guía de Respuesta en Caso de Emergencia) and French. In 1996 it was published as the North American Emergency Response Guidebook, but by the next publication in 2000 "North American" was removed due to its use by several South American countries).
The ERG "is primarily a guide to aid first responders in quickly identifying the specific or generic hazards of the material(s) involved in the incident, and protecting themselves and the general public during the initial response phase of
the incident" and should only be used for the "initial response phase" ("that period 
following arrival at the scene of an incident during which the presence and/or identification 
of dangerous goods is confirmed, protective actions and area securement are initiated, and 
assistance of qualified personnel is requested.") of an incident . It is divided into six color-coded sections (white [uncolored], yellow, blue, orange, green, and a second white [uncolored]). The ERG includes 62 "Guides" (found in the Orange Section) that identify the primary hazards associated with the applicable general category of hazardous material and general guidance on how to respond to incidents involving that general category of hazardous material. The primary purpose of ERG is to direct the emergency responders to the most appropriate of these guides, based on the incident. The ERG also provides guidance regarding recommended evacuation distances, if applicable, in the Green Section.

Sections

White Section (front) 
The first section, with white page (uncolored) borders, provides the following:
Information regarding shipping documents
Instructions on how to use the guidebook
General guidance for responding to any hazardous material incident
Basic information on the hazard classification system and the associated placards/labels
Recommendations the proper guides based transporting vehicle types and/or placards (when the material in question cannot be further identified otherwise)
General safety precautions
Specific guidance for incidents involving pipelines

Yellow Section 
The second section, with yellow page borders, references the material in order of its assigned 4-digit ID number/UN/NA number (which is often placarded with the other hazardous materials placards) and identifies the appropriate guide number to reference in the Orange Section). Items highlighted in green in this section will have evacuation distances included in the Green Section.

Blue Section 
The third section, with blue page borders, references the material in alphabetical order of its name and identifies the appropriate guide number to reference in the Orange Section). Items highlighted in green in this section will also have evacuation distances included in the Green Section.

Orange Section 
The fourth section, with orange page borders, includes the actual response guides. Each of the 62 guides provides safety recommendations and directions on how to proceed during the initial response phase (first thirty minutes) of the incident. It includes "health" and "fire or explosion" potential hazard information (with the more dangerous hazard listed first). For example, "the material gives off irritating vapors, easily ignited by heat, reactive with water"; "highly toxic, may be fatal if inhaled, swallowed or absorbed through skin"; etc. 
 
Next this section includes information for responders on appropriate protective clothing and possible evacuation information for either spill or fire is given. It also includes information on fighting fires (example, do not apply water to sodium), warnings for spills or leaks, and special directions for first aid (example, not to give mouth-to-mouth resuscitation if the materials are toxic).

In the event of an unknown material, Guide #111 should be followed until more information becomes available.

Green Section 
The fifth section, with green page borders, suggests initial evacuation or shelter in place distances (protective action distances) for spills of materials that are Toxic-by-Inhalation (TIH). These distances vary based on the size of the spill (small or large) and whether the incident occurs during the day or at night. Only materials that were highlighted in green in the Yellow and Blue Sections are included in the Green Section.
This section also includes information regarding toxic gases that are produced when certain materials are spilled in water (as identified previously in this section). Finally, this section includes some very specific evacuation details for six common materials.

White Section (back) 
The sixth section, with white page (uncolored) borders, provides the following:
Additional instructions on how to use the guidebook
Information regarding protective clothing and equipment
Instructions on fire and spill control
BLEVE (boiling liquid expanding vapor explosion) safety precautions
Beginning with the 2004 edition, information specifically for hazardous materials being used for terrorism
Glossary of terms used in the ERG
Contact information for the various countries

See also 
 Dangerous goods
 Emergency management
 Wireless Information System for Emergency Responders

References

External links
Editions of the ERG:

 2020 Edition - Current Edition - (Archived)
 2016 Edition - (Archived)
 2012 Edition - (Archived)
 2008 Edition - (Archived)
 2004 Edition - (Archived)
 2000 Edition - At Internet Archive
 1996 Edition - At Internet Archive

Other links
 - The United States Pipeline and Hazardous Materials Safety Administration
 - Transport Canada webpage
Press release announcing 2016 edition ERG release

1973 non-fiction books
1996 non-fiction books
2000 non-fiction books
2004 non-fiction books
2008 non-fiction books
2012 non-fiction books
Handbooks and manuals
Firefighting
Emergency management
Firefighting in the United States
Hazardous materials